Fatezhsky District is an administrative and municipal district (raion), one of the twenty-eight in Kursk Oblast, Russia. It is located in the north of the oblast. Its administrative center is the town of Fatezh. Population:  23,194 (2002 Census);  The population of Fatezh accounts for 28.0% of the district's total population.

Geography
Fatezhsky District is located in the north of Kursk Oblast, on the border with Oryol Oblast to the north.  The terrain is hilly plain averaging 200 meters above sea level; the district lies on the area of the Central Russian Upland.  The main river in the district is the Svapa River, which flows south to the Seym River.   The district is 30 km northeast of the city of Kursk, and 425 km southwest of Moscow.   The area measures 45 km (north-south), and 35 km (west-east); total area is 1,290 km2 (4.3% of Kursk Oblast).  The administrative center is the town of Fatezh.

The district is bordered on the north by Trosnyansky District of Oryol Oblast, on the east by Zolotukhinsky District, on the south by Kursky District, and on the west by Zheleznogorsky District.

Towns and settlements
2nd Banino
2nd Gnezdilovo

References

Notes

Sources

External links
Fatezhsky District on Google Maps
Fatezhsky District on OpenStreetMap

Districts of Kursk Oblast